Grone is a comune (municipality) in the Province of Bergamo in the Italian region of Lombardy, located about  northeast of Milan and about  east of Bergamo.

Grone borders the following municipalities: Adrara San Martino, Berzo San Fermo, Casazza, Monasterolo del Castello, Vigano San Martino.

Demographic evolution

References